Turčianky is a village and municipality in Partizánske District in the Trenčín Region of western Slovakia.

History
In historical records the village was first mentioned in 1293.

Geography
The municipality lies at an altitude of 230 metres and covers an area of 3.734 km². It has a population of about 156 people.

External links
http://www.statistics.sk/mosmis/eng/run.html

Villages and municipalities in Partizánske District